The Gilded Cage (Portuguese: A Gaiola Dourada) is a Franco-Portuguese comedy film released in 2013. The film was Ruben Alves' directorial debut and it was inspired by his parents' life.

The film was released April 24 in France and was released on August 1 in Portugal, after a successful preview showing at the Azores Festival.

It won the People's Choice Award at the 26th European Film Awards. It was the film with the most admissions at the Portuguese box office in 2013, with 755 000 and it is the 7th film with most admissions and the 3rd highest-grossing in Portugal since 2004.

The film won the Radio-Canada Audience Award at the 2014 edition of the Cinéfranco film festival.

Cast
 Rita Blanco as Maria Ribeiro
 Joaquim de Almeida as José Ribeiro
 Roland Giraud as Francis Cailaux
 Chantal Lauby as Solange Cailaux
 Barbara Cabrita as Paula Ribeiro
 Lannick Gautry as Charles Cailaux
 Maria Vieira as Rosa
 Jacqueline Corado as Lourdes
 Jean-Pierre Martins as Carlos
 Alex Alves Pereira as Pedro Ribeiro
 Catarina Wallenstein as Fadosinger
 Alice Isaaz as Cassiopée

References

External links

2013 films
2013 comedy films
European Film Awards winners (films)
2010s French-language films
2010s Portuguese-language films
French comedy films
Portuguese comedy films
French multilingual films
Portuguese multilingual films
2010s French films